Dayton is a city and county seat in Rhea County, Tennessee, United States.  As of the 2020 census, the city population was 7,065. The Dayton Urban Cluster, which includes developed areas adjacent to the city and extends south to Graysville.

Dayton was the site of the Scopes Trial in 1925 dealing with the creation–evolution controversy.

History

The community was originally settled circa 1820 as Smith's Crossroads. In 1877, the town was renamed Dayton, after Dayton, Ohio. The town was incorporated in 1903. Early industry included manufacture of pig iron.

Scopes trial
In 1925, the famous Scopes Trial was held in Dayton and, for a period of time, filled the town with hucksters of every description and journalists from around the world. The participants included William Jennings Bryan in the role of prosecutor and Clarence Darrow as the principal defense counsel.  The trial was over the issue of whether evolution should be taught in public schools. John T. Scopes, the defendant in the trial, was a local science teacher who was recruited by George Rappleyea to begin to teach evolution in his science class, and at the provocation of the ACLU (American Civil Liberties Union), despite it being against Tennessee law at that time.  Rappleyea believed that this conflict would create an enormous amount of publicity for the town, and he was proven correct.  The town bustled with activity as people began to flock from near and far to hear the verdict on this controversial issue.

Although this trial is often represented as being pivotal in the movement to allow evolution to be taught in American schools, it actually marked the beginning of a major decline in the teaching of evolution which did not start to recover until the early 1960s. Likewise, the Butler Act, which Scopes was supposed to have violated—though it was never invoked again—remained on the books until 1967, when it was repealed by the Tennessee Legislature.

H. L. Mencken famously covered the trial for the Baltimore Sun and recruited Clarence Darrow to lead the defense team.

Immediately after the trial, Bryan continued to edit and deliver speeches, traveling hundreds of miles that week. On July 26, 1925, he drove from Chattanooga to Dayton to attend a church service, ate a meal, and died (the result of diabetes and fatigue) in his sleep that afternoon—just five days after the Scopes trial ended.

Geography
Dayton is located at 35°30′N 85°1′W (35.493, -85.013).

Climate
Dayton has a humid subtropical climate with four distinct seasons; hot and humid in the summer, warm and mild in spring and fall, and cool in winter with some snow.

Demographics

2020 census

As of the 2020 United States census, there were 7,065 people, 2,311 households, and 1,510 families residing in the city.

2000 census
As of the census of 2000, there were 6,180 people, 2,323 households, and 1,558 families residing in the city. The population density was 1,007.9 people per square mile (389.3/km2). There were 2,492 housing units at an average density of 406.4 per square mile (157.0/km2). The racial makeup of the city was 90.7% White, 5.3% African American, 0.2% Native American, 0.7% Asian, <0.1% Pacific Islander, 1.8% from other races, and 1.3% from two or more races. Hispanic or Latino of any race were 3.1% of the population.

There were 2,323 households, out of which 31.5% had children under the age of 18 living with them, 47.7% were married couples living together, 15.3% had a female householder with no male present, and 32.9% were non-families. 29.2% of all households were made up of individuals, and 12.9% had someone living alone who was 65 years of age or older. The average household size was 2.40 and the average family size was 2.95.

In the city, the age distribution of the population shows 23.5% under the age of 18, 16.0% from 18 to 24, 25.4% from 25 to 44, 20.8% from 45 to 64, and 14.3% who were 65 years of age or older. The median age was 34 years. For every 100 females, there were 86.8 males. For every 100 females age 18 and over, there were 82.4 males.

The median income for a household in the city was $23,870, and the median income for a family was $32,149. Males had a median income of $28.765 versus $20,144 for females. The per capita income for the city was $12,946. About 13.4% of families and 32.9% of the population were below the poverty line, including 24.0% of those under age 18 and 16.6% of those age 65 or over.

Economy
Dayton is a small manufacturing center whose products include furniture, clothing, automobile parts, and recreational vehicle components. La-Z-Boy is the largest manufacturing employer, followed by Suburban Manufacturing, Robinson Manufacturing, and International Automotive Components Group. Finland-based Nokian Tyres plans to employ around 400 at its new Dayton tire manufacturing factory which began initial operations in 2019. The Tennessee Valley Authority's Watts Bar and Sequoyah nuclear power plants are both within  of the city. 
Since the late 1990s the area has experienced increased residential development particularly along Chickamauga Lake, an impoundment of the Tennessee River. More recently, Dayton has hosted several major bass fishing tournaments at Chickamauga Lake including the 2014 Bassmaster BASSfest, American Bass Anglers Weekend Series, Heartland Anglers Classic, the 2013 Walmart FLW Tour and various senior, collegiate and high school events.

Education
Dayton is home to Bryan College, a four-year Christian liberal arts school named in honor of William Jennings Bryan, who died in Dayton five days after the Scopes Trial ended.

Chattanooga State Community College operates a site in downtown Dayton with a variety of offerings including General Education core for most majors and selected career courses. A Welding Technology course is also offered as part of the TCAT program. 

Dayton City School, a K-8 public school, is free for all residents of Dayton. Dayton residents attend Rhea County High School, operated by Rhea County Schools.

Rhea Central Elementary School, operated by the county school system and serving people not living in the city, is just outside the city limits. It is the largest K-5 public school in the state. Graysville Elementary School in Graysville also has a Dayton postal address.

Omega Graduate School, an institution of Christian postgraduate education, is located in Dayton's Crystal Springs community.

Notable people
 Howard Armstrong (March 4, 1909 – July 30, 2003) – African American string band and country blues musician
 Joseph Aloysius Durick (October 13, 1914 – June 26, 1994) – U.S. Roman Catholic bishop and civil rights advocate
 Jake Gaither (April 11, 1903 – February 18, 1994) – Hall of Fame head football coach at Florida A&M University (FAMU) for 25 years; won six black national championships and amassed one of the highest winning percentages in collegiate history
 Russ Hodges (June 18, 1910 – April 19, 1971) – baseball broadcaster for New York and San Francisco Giants; best known for calling Bobby Thomson's famed 1951 Shot Heard 'Round the World
 Red Holt (July 25, 1894 – February 2, 1961) – former Major League Baseball first baseman with the Philadelphia Athletics
 Dave Roller – former NFL defensive lineman
 John Scopes (August 3, 1900 – October 21, 1970) – teacher charged with violating Tennessee's Butler Act and tried in a case popularly known as the Scopes Monkey Trial
 Rachel Held Evans (June 8, 1981 – May 4, 2019) – Columnist and New York Times Best Selling Author
 Cory Gearrin (April 14, 1986 – Present ) – Major League Baseball pitcher, currently a free agent, most recently with the Minnesota Twins
 Walter White - member of the Tennessee General Assembly

References

Works cited

External links

 Official site
 City charter 
 Tennessee Strawberry Festival
 Bryan College
 Annual re-enactment of the Scopes Trial, holden (as Mencken would have said) in Dayton.

Cities in Tennessee
Cities in Rhea County, Tennessee
County seats in Tennessee
Scopes Trial
Tennessee populated places on the Tennessee River
Populated places established in 1820
1820 establishments in Tennessee